Steven Brian Istead (born 23 April 1986) is an English professional footballer who plays for Buxton F.C. as a midfielder and is their club captain.

Career
Born in South Shields, Istead began his career with the youth team of Newcastle United. He left without making a first-team appearance, and signed for Hartlepool United in 2002, where he held the record for the youngest player to ever play for Hartlepool United until it was beaten in 2004 by striker David Foley. He also became the youngest player to score for Hartlepool, aged 17 years and 112 days old, when he scored in a 2–2 draw against Sheffield Wednesday in the League Cup in 2003, however, this record was broken in 2012 by Luke James. Despite making his senior debut in 2002, Istead didn't sign his first professional contract with Hartlepool until June 2005. However, he was released from his contract less than a year later, in May 2006. During his four seasons with Hartlepool, Istead made a total of 64 appearances in the Football League.

Istead later played for non-league clubs Gateshead and Consett, before moving to Scottish side Peterhead in 2007, where he made 24 appearances in the Scottish Football League Second Division alongside his former Hartlepool boss Neale Cooper. After one season in Scotland, Istead returned south of the border to play for Ilkeston Town. On 10 June 2009, Istead signed for Mansfield Town. On 1 December 2009, Istead joined Alfreton Town of the Conference North on a month-long loan deal. After being released by Mansfield at the end of the 2010–11 season, Istead signed for Eastwood Town in June 2011.

He took temporary charge of Eastwood Town for three games while a new manager was being appointed in October 2011.

Istead joined Buxton at the beginning on the 2013–14 season and was named as the club captain.

References
General

Post War English & Scottish Football League A–Z Player's Database

Specific

1986 births
Living people
English footballers
Newcastle United F.C. players
Hartlepool United F.C. players
Gateshead F.C. players
Consett A.F.C. players
Peterhead F.C. players
Ilkeston Town F.C. (1945) players
Mansfield Town F.C. players
Alfreton Town F.C. players
Eastwood Town F.C. players
English Football League players
Scottish Football League players
National League (English football) players
Northern Premier League players
Northern Football League players
Footballers from South Shields
Association football midfielders
Buxton F.C. players